This is a family tree of Chinese monarchs during the Spring and Autumn period.

Spring and Autumn period

The Spring and Autumn period was a period in Chinese history from approximately 770 to 476 BC (or according to some authorities until 403 BC) which corresponds roughly to the first half of the Eastern Zhou period.  The period's name derives from the Spring and Autumn Annals, a chronicle of the state of Lu between 722 and 479 BCE, which tradition associates with Confucius (551–479 BCE).

Jin

Lu

Song

Wey

Zheng

Cai

Cao

Chen

Wu

Notes

References

Sources 
 
 
 
 

Chinese monarchs
Dynasty genealogy